Pearls from the River is the seventh album by Pelt, released on October 14, 2003 through VHF Records.

Track listing

Personnel 
Pelt
Patrick Best – bass guitar, cello
Mike Gangloff – banjo, esraj, tanpura
Jack Rose – guitar, baritone banjo
Production and additional personnel
Mikel Dimmick – recording
Bill Kellum – production
Justin Lucas – illustrations
Pelt – production

References 

2003 albums
Pelt (band) albums
VHF Records albums